Victoriano Santos Iriarte (2 November 1902 – 10 November 1968), nicknamed "El Canario" (The Canary), was an Uruguayan football forward, member of the Uruguay national team that won the first ever World Cup in 1930, and of Racing Club de Montevideo at the club level.

Iriarte, an outside left, played all four of Uruguay's matches in the 1930 World Cup and scored two goals; one in the semifinal against Yugoslavia and the one in the 68th minute of the final match to give Uruguay a 3–2 lead in their comeback win against Argentina.

International goals
Uruguay's goal tally first

External links
 Profile at enciclopedia-football.com
 

1902 births
1930 FIFA World Cup players
1968 deaths
Uruguayan footballers
Association football forwards
Uruguay international footballers
FIFA World Cup-winning players
Racing Club de Montevideo players
Granada CF managers
Uruguayan football managers